Highway 3 is an Iraqi highway which extends from Baghdad to Baqubah. And then it begins again from Irbil to Piranshahr in Iran to Iranian Road 26.  

Roads in Iraq